George Stephen Latimer (born November 22, 1953) is an American politician serving as County Executive of Westchester County, New York since 2018. A member of the Democratic Party, he previously served as a member of the New York State Senate for the 37th District from 2013 to 2017. Latimer previously served on the Rye city council, in the Westchester County legislature, and in the New York State Assembly. Latimer was elected as the Westchester County Executive in November 2017, defeating Incumbent Republican Rob Astorino. As of 2021, Latimer has never lost an election in three decades in public office.

Early life
Born in Mount Vernon, New York, to Stanley and Loretta (née Miner) Latimer, Latimer attended local public schools. He graduated with a B.A. from Fordham University in the Bronx in 1974 and received a Master's Degree in Public Administration (MPA) from New York University's Wagner School in 1976.

He worked for two decades as a marketing executive in the hospitality industry for major organizations, including subsidiaries of Nestle and ITT.

Career prior to 2010

Latimer first ran for public office in 1987; he won a seat on the Rye City Council, finishing first in a field of 6 major party candidates. Latimer was elevated in 1991 to the Westchester County Board of Legislators, the first-ever Democrat to win the 7th District seat representing the City of Rye, Village of Larchmont, and Mamaroneck Town and Village. Latimer was re-elected in 1993, 1995, and 1997; in January 1998, Democrats won a majority of seats in the County Board for the first time in 90 years. Latimer was elected to chair the board, and was the first Democrat ever to do so. He was re-elected to his legislative seat in 1999, and served a second term as chairman from 2000 to 2001.

Latimer did not seek a third term as chair in 2002, having been re-elected to a sixth term in the Westchester County Legislature. Westchester County Democrats elected him County Democratic Party Chairman in September 2002, where he served one two-year term. After re-election to the County Legislature in 2003, Latimer sought and won a seat in the New York State Assembly in 2004. In the Assembly, Latimer represented the 91st District, which included the Sound Shore communities of New Rochelle, Rye Brook, and Port Chester alongside the communities of his County Legislative District. He defeated his Republican opponent Vincent Malfetano with over 68% of the vote, carrying each of the district's seven cities, towns and villages. Latimer was re-elected to the Assembly seat without opposition in 2006, and scored 71% of the vote in his 2008 victory over Republican Rob Biagi. Latimer won a fourth Assembly term in 2010, defeating Conservative Republican Bill Reed with 67% of the vote.

New York State Senate
Upon the retirement of Senator Suzi Oppenheimer (D) in January 2012, Latimer, a Democrat, ran for the New York State Senate in the 37th District against Republican Bob Cohen. Latimer prevailed on Election Day.

Latimer was re-elected to a second term in November 2014, defeating Republican Joseph L. Dillon.

In 2016, Latimer was challenged by Republican Rye City Council member Julie Killian. Killian's campaign outspent Latimer's by nearly 5-to-1. Latimer won a third term, defeating Killian by 56% to 44%.

Westchester County Executive
In 2017, Latimer challenged incumbent Republican Rob Astorino for Westchester County Executive.

During the campaign, Latimer was criticized for missing state budget votes in April 2017 while reportedly vacationing in the United Kingdom with a woman other than his wife. Astorino called for Latimer to "step down from the state Senate's Education Committee because he missed the state budget vote..." In October 2017, the New York Post reported that Latimer had "told fellow Democrats he was attending the [United Kingdom] trip with his wife, Robin... The state budget was passed a week after the April 1 deadline this year, and Latimer missed the votes on legislation approving school funding, tax revenues and the capital budget." Latimer accused Astorino of "trying to divert voters' attention — but didn't deny taking the trip"; when asked where he was during the skipped votes, Latimer told reporters that the subject was "not [their] business."
		
The Latimer campaign, in turn, accused Astorino of receiving a sweetheart deal on a Rolex watch due to his relationship with a businessman who had pleaded guilty to fraud charges; Latimer's campaign called for Astorino's resignation based on the allegations.

Latimer defeated Astorino by 14 points despite being outspent over 3-to-1 by Astorino's campaign.

On November 2, 2021, Latimer was re-elected to a second term as county executive.

Latimer is considering that he may purchase the land around Pocantico Lake Park to create a new county park.

Electoral results

{| class="wikitable" style="font-size: 95%;"
! colspan="5" |2017 Westchester County Executive election
|-
! colspan="2" style="width: 15em" |Party
! style="width: 10em" |Candidate
! style="width: 5em" |Votes
! style="width: 7em" |Percentage
|-
! style="background-color:#3333FF; width: 3px" |
| style="width: 130px" |Democratic
|George S. Latimer
| align="right" |116,834
| align="right" |53.2%
|-
! style="background-color:#CC6699; width: 3px" |
| style="width: 130px" |Working Families
|George S. Latimer
| align="right" |4,034
| align="right" |1.8%
|-
! style="background-color:#800080; width: 3px" |
| style="width: 130px" |Independence
|George S. Latimer
| align="right" |2,214
| align="right" |1.0%
|-
! style="background-color:#E0218A; width: 3px" |
| style="width: 130px" |Women's Equality
|George S. Latimer
| align="right" |960
| align="right" |0.4%
|-
! style="background-color:#0F4D92; width: 3px" |
| style="width: 130px" |Reform
|George S. Latimer
| align="right" |231
| align="right" |0.1%
|-
! style="background-color:#B2BEB5; width: 3px" |
| style="width: 130px" |Total
|George S. Latimer
| align="right" |124,273
| align="right" |56.6%
|-
! style="background-color:#FF3333; width: 3px" |
| style="width: 130px" |Republican
|Rob Astorino
| align="right" |82,929
| align="right" |37.8%
|-
! style="background-color:#FF8C00; width: 3px" |
| style="width: 130px" |Conservative
|Rob Astorino
| align="right" |12,441
| align="right" |5.7%
|-
! style="background-color:#B2BEB5; width: 3px" |
| style="width: 130px" |Total
|Rob Astorino
| align="right" |95,370
| align="right" |43.4%
|- bgcolor="#EEEEEE"
| colspan="3" align="right" |Majority
| align="right" |28,903
| align="right" |13.2%
|-
|- bgcolor="#EEEEEE"
| colspan="3" align="right" |Totals
| align="right" |219,643
| align="right" |100.0%
|-
! style="background-color:#3333FF; width: 3px" |
| colspan="4" |Democratic gain from Republican

References

External links
New York State Senate website

1953 births
Living people
Westchester County, New York Executives
Democratic Party New York (state) state senators
Politicians from Mount Vernon, New York
Legislators from Westchester County, New York
21st-century American politicians
Mount Vernon High School (New York) alumni